Academic ranks in Kenya are the titles, relative importance and power of professors, researchers, and administrative personnel held in academia.

Overview

Kenya’s universities Act of 2012 defines an "academic staff'” as a "person appointed to teach, train or to do research at a university and any other employee designated as such by the university council". The definition of professor is left to each individual university. Professors are primarily senior members of university teaching and/or research faculty. Generally, there is no clear distinction between research and academic. However, the  University of Nairobi has a tradition of appointing faculty in both the research and academic streams, thus, junior research fellow=assistant lecturer, research fellow=lecturer, associate professorial research fellow=associate professor and the professorial research fellow=professor.

Both the associate and full professors must have PhDs or a qualification considered equivalent. In the Moi University and University of Nairobi, where they have a longer history offering medical qualifications, a post medical qualification Master of Medicine (M.Med.) is considered an equivalent of a PhD in other fields. So a holder of an M.Med. who has been a senior lecturer for three years, together with requisite publications and supervisions may be appointed associate professor, then full professor. In Moi University again, there is an example of a senior legal scholar and practitioner who was appointed full professor based on a personal evaluation. His long teaching experience, myriad academic and technical publications and his two LL.M.s were considered as equivalents. Generally lower degree holders can not go beyond the senior lecturer level; however, this is left for each university to decide. To be a full professor in all the Kenyan universities, one ought to have served as an associate professor for four years and at least three peer-reviewed publications in international journals or similarly considered technical publications. Technical patents too are considered. Postgraduate research supervision and outreach are also crucial.

Outside of the appointive tenures, some very senior academic staff in the Kenyan universities do get baptized  "professor" by their students or colleagues. This is because they are usually very senior, have mentored many, or they have achieved a lot of academic grounding without the benefit of promotions which can get gruesomely political. A lot of victims are those with solid research credentials combined with great teaching and outreach experience but have not acquired a PhD or equivalent for one reason or the other. The same also applies to some extremely productive young academics that have not attained the right longevity for appointment as professors.  Many people from outside of the university fraternity might also just refer to any long serving academic staff as professor. All these are usually acceptable without any question.

Many people rightly argue that professorial appointments should not be based on longevity, loyalty or sheer availability of vacancies to be filled, but rather on prowess as evidenced by ground breaking research, teaching and outreach. Professorship should not be a reward for loyalty. Whatever the criteria of appointment, it should remain a mark of highest academic and research pedigree, they assert.

References

Academic ranks
Education in Kenya
Ranks